The Burmese calendar (or , ; Burmese Era (BE) or Myanmar Era (ME)) is a lunisolar calendar in which the months are based on lunar months and years are based on sidereal years. The calendar is largely based on an older version of the Hindu calendar, though unlike the Indian systems, it employs a version of the Metonic cycle. The calendar therefore has to reconcile the  sidereal years of the Hindu calendar with the Metonic cycle's near tropical years by adding intercalary months and days at irregular intervals.

The calendar has been used continuously in various Burmese states since its purported launch in 640 CE in the Sri Ksetra Kingdom, also called the Pyu era. It was also used as the official calendar in other mainland Southeast Asian kingdoms of Arakan, Lan Na, Xishuangbanna, Lan Xang, Siam, and Cambodia down to the late 19th century.

Today, the calendar is used in Myanmar as one of the two official calendars alongside the Gregorian calendar. It is still used to mark traditional holidays such as the Burmese New Year, and other traditional festivals, many of which are Burmese Buddhist in nature.

History

Origin
The Burmese chronicles trace the origin of the Burmese calendar to ancient India with the introduction of the Kali Yuga Era in 3102 BCE. That seminal calendar is said to have been recalibrated by King Añjana, the maternal grandfather of the Buddha, in 691 BCE. That calendar in turn was recalibrated and replaced by the Buddhist Era with the starting year of 544 BCE. The Buddhist Era came to be adopted in the early Pyu city-states by the beginning of the Common Era. Then in 78 CE, a new era called the Shalivahana era, also called Sakra Era or Saka Era, was launched in India. Two years later the new era was adopted in the Pyu state of Sri Ksetra, and the era later spread to the rest of the Pyu states.

According to the chronicles, the Pagan Kingdom at first followed the prevailing Saka Pyu Era, but in 640 CE King Popa Sawrahan (r. 613–640) recalibrated the calendar, naming the new era Kawza Thekkarit with a Year Zero starting date of 22 March 638 CE. It was used as the civil calendar, while the Buddhist Era remained in use as the religious calendar.

Scholarship accepts the chronicle narrative regarding the North Indian origin of the calendar and the chronology of adoption in Burma up to the Mahāsakaraj Era. Recent research suggests that the Gupta Era (epochal year of 320 CE) may also have been in use in the Pyu states. Mainstream scholarship, however, holds that the recalibrated calendar was launched at Sri Ksetra, and later adopted by the upstart principality of Pagan.

Spread
The adoption by an ascendant Pagan paved the way for the calendar's adoption elsewhere in the Pagan Empire between the 11th and 13th centuries. The calendar first came to be used in peripheral regions or neighbouring states such as Arakan in the west and various Shan states in modern northern Thailand and Laos in the east, which adopted the calendar alongside folklore connected with the Burmese New Year. According to the Chiang Mai Chronicles and the Chiang Saen Chronicles, Chiang Mai and Chiang Saen and their tributary states of middle and upper Tai country (except Lamphun and Sukhothai) submitted to King Anawrahta and adopted the calendar in the mid-11th century in place of Mahāsakaraj, the standard calendar of the Khmer Empire. However, scholarship says the earliest evidence of Burmese calendar in modern Thailand dates only to the mid-13th century.

While the use of the calendar appears to have spread southward to Sukhothai and eastward to Laotian states in the following centuries, the official adoption farther south by the Ayutthaya Kingdom and farther east by Lan Xang came only after King Bayinnaung's conquests of those kingdoms in the 16th century. Subsequent Siamese kingdoms retained the Burmese calendar as the official calendar under the name of Chulasakarat (Pali: Culāsakaraj) until 1889. The Siamese adoption turned out to be the main catalyst for the calendar's usage in Cambodia, a periodic vassal of Siam between the 16th and 19th centuries. Likewise, the calendar spread to the Chittagong region of Bengal, which was dominated by the Arakanese Mrauk-U Kingdom from the 15th to 17th centuries.

Development and changes
The calculation system of the Burmese calendar was originally based on Thuriya Theiddanta (which is believed to be chiefly based on the "original" Surya Siddhanta system of ancient India (i.e. Ardharatrika school). One key difference from Indian systems was that the Burmese system followed a 19-year intercalation schedule (Metonic cycle). It is unclear from where, when or how the Metonic system was introduced; hypotheses range from China to Europe.

The Burmese system thus uses a "strange" combination of sidereal years from the Indian calendar with the Metonic cycle, which is better for tropical years than sidereal years, so necessitating intercalation adjustments to reconcile the differences. Furthermore, the Burmese system did not incorporate advances in Indian calculation methods of the sidereal year until the mid-19th century. (The original Thuriya Theiddanta system is 0.56 second a year slower (and more accurate) than later Indian systems.)

The earliest attempts on record to change the calendar were superficial. On the 800th anniversary of the calendar (29 March 1438), King Mohnyin Thado recalibrated the calendar to Year 2 (with Year Zero beginning on 18 March 1436). But the king died just over a year after the launch, and the new era died out a few years later. The next proposed change came in March 1638 from King Prasat Thong of Siam who in preparation of the upcoming millennial anniversary (10 April 1638) wanted to make a change to the governing animals of the months. As the practice was not prevalent in Burma, the proposal was rejected by King Thalun.

Meanwhile, the growing cumulative discrepancy between the civil solar and luni-solar years attracted increasing attention. In the 1100th anniversary year (1738 CE) a new system of calculation was proposed that aimed to correct the errors of the original system, but the Toungoo court did not take any action. The present Surya Siddhanta (i.e., Saura school) was introduced to the Konbaung court in 1786, and was translated into Burmese after about 50 years. Finally, a new system called Thandeikta was proposed by Nyaunggan Sayadaw, a Buddhist monk, in Year 1200 (1838 CE).

The new system was a hybrid between the original and the updated Surya schools. Unlike the new Surya, Thandeikta does not adopt the system of apparent reckoning; mean years and mean months are still used. It also retains the practice of placing the intercalary month always next to Waso and the intercalary day always at the end of Nayon, and only in a year which has an intercalary month. But Thandeikta follows the new Surya in small alterations of the length of the year and the month. The prevailing Metonic schedule was modified, and intercalary months were so fixed as to prevent further divergence between the solar and luni-solar years. With the support of Princess Sekkya Dewi, who later became the chief queen of King Mindon, the new system was fully adopted in 1853. The first adjustment to then existing Metonic Cycle was made by putting an intercalary month in 1201 ME (1839 CE) instead of 1202 ME (1840).

While the new system has seemingly narrowed the gap between the calendar's solar and lunar years, it has not made the calendar more accurate when compared against the actual tropical year. Indeed, it is slightly worse than the old system. (The Thandeikta solar year is about 23 minutes 51.4304 seconds ahead of the mean solar year whereas Makaranta is about 23 minutes 50.8704 seconds ahead.) As a result, the calendar has kept on drifting away from the actual solar year. The calendarists have periodically resorted to modifying its intercalation schedule, based on apparent reckoning, to keep pace, at the expense of making publishing future calendars more than a few years out all but impossible.

In sum, at various times the calendar has used at least three slightly different methods of calculation to determine the insertion times of the intercalary day and month.

Current status
The calendar fell out of official status in several mainland Southeast Asian kingdoms (except Burma) in the second half of the 19th century with the arrival of European colonialism. The Gregorian calendar replaced the Burmese calendar in Cambodia in 1863 and Laos in 1889. In 1889, the only remaining independent kingdom in Southeast Asia, Siam, also replaced the Burmese calendar and switched to the Gregorian calendar as the official civil calendar and the Ratanakosin Era (with 1782 CE as Year 1) as the traditional lunisolar calendar.

In Burma (Myanmar), the Burmese calendar has not been replaced, but used alongside the Gregorian calendar after the fall of the Burmese kingdom. Thailand has moved on to its own version of the Buddhist calendar since 1941, although the Chulasakarat era dates remain the most commonly used and preferred form of entry in academia for historical studies.
The Chittagong Magi-San calendar, identical to the Arakanese calendar, is still used by certain ethnic minorities of Bangladesh.

Today, the Calendar Advisory Board within the Ministry of Religious Affairs and Culture of Myanmar is tasked with keeping the lunisolar calendar in line with the solar year.

Structure

Day
The calendar recognises two types of day: astronomical and civil. The mean Burmese astronomical day is from midnight to midnight, and represents 1/30 of a synodic month or 23 hours, 37 minutes and 28.08 seconds. The civil day comprises two halves, the first half beginning at sunrise and the second half at sunset. In practice, four points of the astronomical and civil day (sunrise, noon, sunset, and midnight) were used as reference points. The civil day is divided into 8 baho (3 hours) or 60 nayi (24 minutes), each baho equalling 7.5 nayi. In the past, a gong was struck every nayi while a drum and a large bell were struck to mark every baho.

Although the popular usage never extended beyond baho and nayi measurements, the calendar consists of time units down to the millisecond level.

Only the following are used in calendrical calculations:

Therefore, modern time units can be expressed as:

Week
The civil week consists of seven days. It was also customary to denote the day of the week by its preassigned numerical value between zero and six. The names Taninganwe (Sunday) and Taninla (Monday) are derived from Old Burmese but the rest from Sanskrit.

Month
The calendar recognises two types of months: synodic month and sidereal month. The Synodic months are used to compose the years while the 27 lunar sidereal days (from Sanskrit nakshatra), alongside the 12 signs of the zodiac, are used for astrological calculations. (The calendar also recognises a solar month called Thuriya Matha, which is defined as 1/12th of a year. But the solar month varies by the type of year such as tropical year, sidereal year, etc.)

The days of the month are counted in two halves, waxing and waning. The 15th of the waxing is the civil full moon day. The civil new moon day is the last day of the month (14th or 15th waning). The mean and real (true) New Moons rarely coincide. The mean New Moon often precedes the real New Moon.

As the Synodic lunar month is approximately 29.5 days, the calendar uses alternating months of 29 and 30 days. The 29-day months are called yet-ma-son la, and the 30-day months are called yet-son la. Unlike in other Southeast Asian traditions, the Burmese calendar uses Burmese names for the month names. Although the names sound foreign in origin to modern Burmese ears, all but three are derived from Old Burmese. The three exceptions—Mleta/Myweta, Nanka, Thantu—which all fall during the Buddhist Lent, have been replaced by newer Burmese names (Waso, Wagaung, Thadingyut), which used to mean just the Full Moon days of the three months.

In great leap years, the month of Nayon gets an extra intercalary day called yet-lun or yet-ngin and has 30 days. In the Arakanese calendar, the month of Tagu gets the extra intercalary day in great leap years.

Year

Types of astronomical year
The calendar recognises three types of astronomical year: tropical year, sidereal year and anomalistic year.

Types of calendar year
The Burmese calendar is a lunisolar calendar in which the months are based on lunar months and years are based on solar years. One of its primary objectives is to regulate the lunar part that it will keep pace with the solar part. The lunar months, normally twelve of them, consist alternately of 29 days and 30 days, such that a normal lunar year will contain 354 days, as opposed to the solar year of ~365.25 days. Therefore, some form of addition to the lunar year (of intercalation) is necessary. The overall basis for it is provided by cycles of 57 years. Eleven extra days are inserted in every 57 years, and seven extra months of 30 days are inserted in every 19 years (21 months in 57 years). This provides 20819 complete days to both calendars.

As such, the calendar adds an intercalary month in leap years and sometimes also an intercalary day in great leap years. The intercalary month not only corrects the length of the year but also corrects the accumulating error of the month to extent of half a day. The average length of the month is further corrected by adding a day to Nayon at irregular intervals—a little more than seven times in two cycles (39 years). The intercalary day is never inserted except in a year which has an intercalary month. The Hindu calendar inserts an intercalary month at any time of year as soon as the accumulated fractions amount to one month. The Burmese calendar however always inserts the intercalary month at the same time of the year, after the summer solstice while the Arakanese calendar inserts it after the vernal equinox.

The actual calendar year (Wawharamatha Hnit) consists of 354, 384 or 385 days.

The Thai Chulasakarat calendar uses a slightly different method to place the intercalary day. Instead of it in a leap year as in the Burmese system, the Thai system places it in a separate year. Thus, the Thai small leap year has 355 days while the Thai great leap year has 384 days. Both systems arrive at the same number of days in a 19-year cycle however. Furthermore, in contrast to Indian calendars, the Burmese calendar follows a Metonic cycle in which intercalary months are inserted on a set schedule. However, because the Burmese calendar has to adjust for the use of Indian-calendar-derived sidereal years with the Metonic cycle's tropical years, maintaining a set Metonic cycle has been a challenge.

The calendar seems to have employed several schedules to determine which of the 19 years will be intercalary years. To find out which year will have an intercalary month, divide the Burmese year by 19. The quotient is the expired cycles. If the remainder tallies with the set sequence number of the prevailing Metonic cycle, then it will be an intercalary year.

New Year's Day
Since the main purpose of the Burmese calendar is to keep pace with the solar year, the new year is always marked by the solar year, which falls at the time when the Sun enters Aries. The date, which at present falls on 16 or 17 April, has slowly drifted over the centuries. In the 20th century, the New Year's Day fell on 15 or 16 April but in the 17th century, it fell on 9 or 10 April.

As a result, the New Year's Day of the Burmese calendar does not have to fall on the first day of the first month of Tagu; in fact, it almost never does fall on the first waxing of Tagu. Tagu is almost always divided into two parts Hnaung Tagu ("Late Tagu"), before the New Year's Day and Oo Tagu ("Early Tagu") on and after the New Year's Day. In some years, the year was so behind the solar year that the new year falls in Kason and both Hnaung Tagu and Hnaung Kason ("Late Kason") exist. Therefore, just saying "Tagu of 1373 ME" is not complete as "Oo Tagu of 1373" corresponds to 2011 CE while "Hnaung Tagu of 1373" corresponds to 2012 CE.

Cycle
The calendar used to employ a 12-year Jovian cycle that redeployed the lunar month names and attached them to the years. The Burmese cycle is not the more familiar Jovian cycle of India with 60 years in it. The practice existed in the Pagan period but had died out by the 17th century.

Epoch
Burmese tradition recognises the following eras. The Buddhist Era and Kawza Era are still in use in Myanmar.

Accuracy
The Burmese calendar uses lunar months but tries to keep pace with the solar year. The present Thandeikta system's solar year is about 23 minutes 51.43 seconds ahead of the actual mean tropical year of 365.241289 days. The older Makaranta system was actually slightly more accurate, with 23 minutes 50.87 seconds ahead of the actual year.
The table below shows how Thandeikta purports to achieve a narrower difference (hence better accuracy) over Makaranta.

The gain in accuracy is 0.0010391634 day (89.78371776 seconds) over 19 years, or about 4.72546 seconds a year. However, this gain is illusory as Thandeikta achieves the gain by redefining the mean lunar month (lunation), which is then more accurate and the solar year, which is less accurate. The table below shows the solar years of both systems in comparison with the actual mean tropical year. Thandeikta is 0.56 second a year less accurate than Makaranta.

In sum, both systems are about 24 minutes per year ahead of the actual tropical year; the systems' methods of intercalation fixes only their internal error; and Thandeikta slightly accelerates the annual drift. The accumulating error means the New Year's Day, which used to fall near the vernal equinox at its launch on 22 March 638 CE (Julian), fell on 17 April (Gregorian) in 2022—a difference of 23 days. Burmese calendarists have dealt with the issue by using apparent reckoning and periodically modifying the intercalation schedule in the Metonic cycle. One major downside of this approach is that it is difficult to publish future calendars more than a few years (often even a year) ahead.

Zodiac

Seasons
The Burmese zodiac, like the Western zodiac, is divided into 12 signs called yathi. The Burmese signs are identical to Indian and Western signs as they were derived from Indian and ultimately Western zodiac. Each yathi is divided into 30 degrees; each degree into 60 minutes; and each minute into 60 seconds.

Lunar mansions

The zodiac month consists of 27 days, approximating the mean sidereal month of 27.321661 days. Thus each zodiac day, called nekkhat, represents a lunar mansion, or a segment of the ecliptic along which the moon revolves around the earth. Though the names are Burmese adaptations of Sanskrit names, the Burmese system is not the same as the modern Indian system. The Burmese system uses unequal spaces for each segment (from 5° to 26°), and the first segment, Athawani, begins at 350° longitude. The modern Indian system uses equal segments of 13° 20' (360° divided by 27), and the first segment, Asvini, begins at 0°. The list below follows the Thandeikta system.

Weekdays
The Burmese zodiac recognises eight signs in a seven-day week.

Variants
The Burmese calendar has a number of variants inside present-day Myanmar as well as outside. The variants outside Myanmar are still in use albeit under a different year numbering system.

Arakanese
According to Arakanese (Rakhine) tradition, the calendar was launched by King Thuriya Thehta of the Dhanyawaddy dynasty. At least down to the early 20th century, the Arakanese calendar used the Makaranta system although the Burmese calendar had moved to the Thandeikta system since the mid-19th century. In the Arakanese calendar, the month of Tagu gets the extra intercalary day in great leap years. Moreover, in Arakanese tradition, only the New Year's Day is observed. The Arakanese calendar under the name of Magi-San is still used by the Magh people of Bangladesh.

Chulasakarat

The Burmese calendar first came to be adopted in present-day northern Thailand in the mid-13th century, and in central Thailand by the second half of the 16th century. Although then mainland kingdoms of Lan Na, Lan Xang, Siam, and later Cambodia adopted the Burmese epoch starting at 638 CE, each region retained its own traditions and/or introduced its own modifications afterwards. For example, the Kengtung, Lan Na, Lan Xang, and Sukhothai calendars still retained the use of numbering the months even though the Burmese calendar stopped using the numbered months alongside the month names. The use of numbering system may have predated the introduction of the Burmese calendar in any case since each region had its own numbering system. The first numbered month in Kengtung, Lan Na, Lan Xang and Sukhothai calendars is Tazaungmon (Karttika), Thadingyut (Asvina), (Nadaw) Margasirsha, and (Nadaw) Margasirsha, respectively. This means reading ancient texts and inscriptions in Thailand requires constant vigilance, not just in making sure one is correctly operating for the correct region, but also for variations within regions itself when incursions cause a variation in practice. (Note: The Sukhothai and Lan Xang numbering systems and the now abandoned Burmese numbering system are the same.)

Likewise, Cambodian and Thai systems have retained the practice of giving animal names to the years from a cycle of 12. The practice also existed in Burma in the Pagan period but later died out.

Moreover, Chulasakarat uses three similar but not identical types of lunar years used by the Burmese calendar. Each calendar has the same regular year of 354 days and a leap year of 384 days. However, whereas the Burmese calendar adds the intercalary day only in a leap cycle according to its Metonic cycle, the Siamese calendar adds the intercalary day to a regular year. The Siamese calendar does add the extra day in the same place (Jyestha/Nayon), however.

Lastly, the calculation methods also diverged in the mid-19th century when the Konbaung dynasty switched to the Thandeikta method, which is 0.56 second per year longer than the old system.

Dai
The traditional Dai calendar of Dai people of the Xishuangbanna in China is largely based on the Burmese calendar although it may have some Chinese influences.

Current usage

Public holidays
The Burmese calendar is still used to determine a number of public holidays in Myanmar.

Date of birth
In Myanmar, people may register their date of birth in a Gregorian or Burmese calendar format.

Official formats
The Burmese language versions of official pronouncements by the government such as laws, notifications, documents are dated in both Burmese and Western (Gregorian) forms. The Burmese calendar date comes first, and is followed by the equivalent Gregorian calendar date in parentheses, both in the Year-Month-Day order. For example, the date of 29 March 2017 is written as:

()

See also
 Chula Sakarat
 Buddhist calendar
 Burmese zodiac

Notes

References

Bibliography

External links
 1500 Years of Myanmar Calendar by Cool Emerald
 Myanmar Calendar by Burmese Classics
 Era Calendar Converter with Burmese calendar

Specific calendars
Calendar